Heleno dos Santos Alves (born August 23, 1978 in São Vicente), or simply Heleno, is a Brazilian football defensive midfielder, who plays for Penapolense.

Heleno previously played for Santos in the Campeonato Brasileiro.

Career

He played for São Vicente, SP-America and Vila Nova-GO, where he won the Championship Goiano 2005. That same year, is presented by the Saints and win the Championship in 2006.

References

External links
 CBF

1978 births
Living people
People from São Vicente, São Paulo
Brazilian footballers
Rio Branco Esporte Clube players
América Futebol Clube (SP) players
Vila Nova Futebol Clube players
Santos FC players
Sport Club do Recife players
Ceará Sporting Club players
Fortaleza Esporte Clube players
Association football midfielders
Footballers from São Paulo (state)